The 1958 Kansas City Athletics season was the team's fourth in Kansas City and the 58th in the American League.  The season involved the A's finishing 7th in the American League with a record of 73 wins and 81 losses, 19 games behind the World Champion New York Yankees.

Offseason 
 November 20, 1957: Billy Martin, Mickey McDermott, Tom Morgan, Lou Skizas, Tim Thompson, and Gus Zernial were traded by the Athletics to the Detroit Tigers for Bill Tuttle, Jim Small, Duke Maas, John Tsitouris, Frank House, and Kent Hadley, and a player to be named later. The Tigers completed the deal by sending Jim McManus to the Athletics on April 3, 1958.
 December 2, 1957: Harry Chiti was drafted by the Athletics from the New York Yankees in the 1957 rule 5 draft.
 December 2, 1957: Ramón Conde was drafted by the Athletics from the San Francisco Giants in the 1957 minor league draft.

Regular season

Season standings

Record vs. opponents

Notable transactions 
 April 15, 1958: Ramón Conde was acquired from the Athletics by the Philadelphia Phillies.
 May 14, 1958: Whitey Herzog was purchased by the Athletics from the Washington Senators.
 June 12, 1958: Billy Hunter was traded by the Athletics to the Cleveland Indians for Chico Carrasquel.
 June 15, 1958: Woodie Held and Vic Power were traded by the Athletics to the Cleveland Indians for Roger Maris, Dick Tomanek and Preston Ward.

Roster

Player stats

Batting

Starters by position 
Note: Pos = Position; G = Games played; AB = At bats; H = Hits; Avg. = Batting average; HR = Home runs; RBI = Runs batted in

Other batters 
Note: G = Games played; AB = At bats; H = Hits; Avg. = Batting average; HR = Home runs; RBI = Runs batted in

Pitching

Starting pitchers 
Note: G = Games pitched; IP = Innings pitched; W = Wins; L = Losses; ERA = Earned run average; SO = Strikeouts

Other pitchers 
Note: G = Games pitched; IP = Innings pitched; W = Wins; L = Losses; ERA = Earned run average; SO = Strikeouts

Relief pitchers 
Note: G = Games pitched; W = Wins; L = Losses; SV = Saves; ERA = Earned run average; SO = Strikeouts

Farm system 

Rochester franchise moved to Winona, June 29, 1958

References

External links
1958 Kansas City Athletics team page at Baseball Reference
1958 Kansas City Athletics team page at www.baseball-almanac.com

Oakland Athletics seasons
Kansas City Athletics season
1958 in sports in Missouri